The Institute of Croatian Language and Linguistics is an official institute in Croatia whose purpose is to preserve and foster the Croatian language. It traces its history back to 1948, when it was part of the Yugoslav Academy of Sciences and Arts (today's Croatian Academy of Sciences and Arts). The modern institute dates back to Croatia's independence in 1991.

The Institute publishes Rasprave, a biannual journal.

Directors 
 Antun Barac
 Stjepan Musulin (1948–1958)
 Mate Hraste (1958–1965)
 Ljudevit Jonke (1965–1973)
 Božidar Finka (1973–1977)
 Antun Šojat (1977–1982)
 Božidar Finka (1982–1987)
 Mijo Lončarić (1987–1996)
 Miro Kačić (1996–2001)
 Marko Samardžija (2001–2002)
 Dunja Brozović-Rončević (2003–2011)
 Željko Jozić (2012–present)

References

External links 
 

Research institutes in Croatia
Linguistic research institutes
Croatian language
Language regulators
Language policy in Bosnia and Herzegovina, Croatia, Montenegro and Serbia